Beverley Dandridge Tucker (November 9, 1846 – January 17, 1930) was the second bishop of the Episcopal Diocese of Southern Virginia. Four of his sons also distinguished themselves within the Episcopal Church.

Early and family life
Born in Richmond, Virginia, on November 9, 1846, Beverley Dandridge Tucker was one of eight children of Nathaniel Beverley Tucker (then a journalist and printer) and his second wife, Jane Shelton Ellis (1820-1901). The Tuckers (and Dandridges) were among the First Families of Virginia, owned plantations and enslaved people, and were proud of their descent from English ancestors. George Tucker of County Kent, England, emigrated to Bermuda about the year 1619, and his descendant, the lawyer and judge St. George Tucker (Tucker's great-grandfather), moved from Bermuda to Virginia in about 1770.

Tucker's father served as U.S. Consul in Liverpool, England, an important trading point for Virginia cotton, from 1857 until joining the Confederate cause in 1861 upon Virginia's secession from the Union. He then represented the Confederacy in the same locale. Young Beverley thus received his early education in English and Swiss schools, and also studied at the University of Toronto. During the American Civil War, Tucker returned to Virginia and enlisted in the Confederate States Army, becoming a private in the Otey battery and witnessing the final eighteen months of the Confederacy.

After the Confederacy was defeated, Tucker taught school for five years in Winchester, Virginia. He also took classes at the University of Toronto and taught school before entering the Virginia Theological Seminary in Alexandria, Virginia, in 1871, where he found his life's work and graduated in 1873. He received honorary degrees from Roanoke College in 1897 and from the College of William and Mary.

Tucker married Anna Maria Washington (1851-1927). They had 13 children, including the Episcopal priest and hymn composer Francis Bland Tucker; Beverley Dandridge Tucker the 6th Bishop of the Episcopal Diocese of Ohio and a Rhodes scholar; and Henry St. George Tucker, the 19th Presiding Bishop of the Episcopal Church, and medical missionary Augustine Washington Tucker.

Career
Tucker became a priest of the Episcopal Church and Bishop John Johns in 1873 assigned him to the historic Lunenburg parish in Richmond County, Virginia, where he rector until 1882. Tucker became a staunch Democrat and chaplain of the Pickett-Buchanan camp of Confederate Veterans. He then accepted a position as rector of the historic St. Paul's Church in Norfolk, Virginia, where he served until consecration as co-adjutor bishop of the new Diocese of Southern Virginia. In 1905, Tucker delivered a sermon on "Continuity of the Life of the Church" at a service inaugurating the restoration of the interior of Bruton Parish Church in nearby Williamsburg to its colonial form and appearance. Tucker served on the board of visitors of William and Mary College in Williamsburg, as well as at the General Convention of the Episcopal Church beginning in 1892 as well as on the board of trustees of his alma mater, Virginia Theological Seminary.

In 1892, the Diocese of Virginia split, as had been contemplated for more than a decade, and Norfolk and Williamsburg were made part of the new Diocese of Southern Virginia, with Alfred Magill Randolph as its first bishop. To ensure continuity, Randolph asked for a co-adjutor bishop in 1906, and Tucker was selected and consecrated by Randolph and several other bishops, including fellow former Confederate George William Peterkin, bishop of the Diocese of West Virginia. Tucker succeed as the diocesan bishop in 1918, upon Randolph's death. He then made Arthur C. Thomson, who had been consecrated as suffragan the previous year as Randolph's health deteriorated, as his co-adjutor. Tucker excelled at social interactions with wealthy potential donors, including Coca-Cola heiress and philanthropist Letitia Pate Whitehead Evans and John D. Rockefeller, Jr., who helped establish Colonial Williamsburg.

Tucker also published several books, including Confederate Verses, Sketch of St. Paul's Church, Scattered Essays and Poems, and My Three Loves (1910).

Death and legacy

Tucker died in 1930 and was buried with his wife among her relatives in the churchyard of Zion Episcopal Church in Charles Town, West Virginia. A plaque in Bruton Parish recognizes Tucker's lifelong work among African-Americans.

References

1930 deaths
1846 births
Beverley Dandridge Tucker
University of Virginia alumni
Virginia Theological Seminary alumni
Washington family
Virginia Democrats
Episcopal bishops of Southern Virginia
People from Richmond, Virginia
Burials at Zion Episcopal Churchyard (Charles Town, West Virginia)